Aleksey Drachev (born 22 August 1994) is a Belarusian professional footballer. As of 2021, he plays for Smolevichi.

References

External links 
 
 

1994 births
Living people
Belarusian footballers
Association football defenders
FC Molodechno players
FC Krumkachy Minsk players
FC Viktoryja Marjina Horka players
FC Smolevichi players